Tino Fa'asuamaleaui (born 16 February 2000) is a professional rugby league footballer who captains the Gold Coast Titans playing as a lock and prop forward in the NRL. He has played for Samoa and Australia at international level. 

He previously played for the Melbourne Storm in the National Rugby League with whom he won the 2020 NRL Grand Final. He has played for the Prime Minister's XIII and the Queensland Maroons in the State of Origin series.

Background
Fa'asuamaleaui was born in Orange, New South Wales, Australia and is of Samoan and European Australian descent. His father, Fereti Fa'asuamaleaui, was contracted to the Sydney City Roosters and played reserve grade for them in the mid-1990s. Fereti had already represented Samoa in Rugby union.

When he was 14 weeks old, his family moved to Widgee, Queensland, where he attended  James Nash State High School, Gympie. He played his junior rugby league for the Gympie Devils and was then signed by the Brisbane Broncos as a teenager.

Playing career

Early career
In 2016, Fa'asuamaleaui played for the Central Crows in the Cyril Connell Cup and was selected to represent the Queensland under-16 side.

In 2017, after starting the season with the Sunshine Coast Falcons Mal Meninga Cup side, he signed with Melbourne, playing for their NYC side. In June, he was selected for the Queensland under-18 side

In 2018, Fa'asuamaleaui began the season playing for the Storm's Queensland Cup feeder side, the Sunshine Coast Falcons, before switching to the club's other feeder, the Easts Tigers, midway through the year. In June, he was again selected for the Queensland under-18 side. In July, he came off the bench in the Queensland under-20's first ever win over New South Wales. In October, he scored two tries in the Junior Kangaroos 40–24 win over the Junior Kiwis.

2019
In Round 16 of the 2019 NRL season, Fa'asuamaleaui made his NRL debut for Melbourne against the St. George. On 7 October, Fa’asuamaleaui was named on the bench for the U23 Junior Australian side. He then followed up by making his international test debut for Toa Samoa. On 19 December, Fa'asuamaleaui signed a three-year deal with the Gold Coast Titans starting in 2021.

2020
Fa’asuamaleaui played off the bench in Melbourne's 2020 NRL Grand Final win over the Penrith Panthers in a 26-20 win. At the Melbourne Storm Player of the Year Awards in October 2020, he was awarded the Rookie of the Year Award.

After the grand final, he was rewarded by making his Queensland Maroons debut in the 2020 State of Origin series Game 1 at the Adelaide Oval.

2021
He made his club debut for the Gold Coast in round 1 of the 2021 NRL season against the New Zealand Warriors.  In round 6, he was placed on report for an illegal shoulder charge during the club's 36-0 loss against Manly-Warringah and suspended for two games.

He played 23 games for the Gold Coast in the 2021 NRL season including the club's elimination final loss against the Sydney Roosters.
On 23 November, he signed a $3.3 million contract extension to remain at the Gold Coast until the end of the 2026 season.

2022
On 3 February, he was named as captain of the Gold Coast Titans.

In May, he was selected by Queensland for games one, two and three of the 2022 State of Origin series.  In game three, he was fined 20% of his payment for the game after grabbing Blues player Matt Burton in a headlock while teammate Dane Gagai repeatedly punched him. It was described as a sickening, disgraceful act and went without proper punishment. In round 14 of the 2022 NRL season, he scored two tries for the Gold Coast in a 30-16 loss against South Sydney.

He played a total of 22 games for the club throughout the season as they finished 13th on the table.

In October he was named in the Australia squad for the 2021 Rugby League World Cup.

He played for Australia in their 2021 Rugby League World Cup final victory over Samoa.

Honours
Individual
 Melbourne Storm Rookie of The Year: 2020
 Gold Coast Titans Member’s MVP: 2021
 Gold Coast Titans Player of The Year "Paul Broughton Medalist": 2021

Club
 2020 NRL Grand Final Winners

Representative
 2020 State of Origin series Winners
 2022 State of Origin series Winners

International
 2021 Rugby League World Cup Winners

References

External links

Gold Coast Titans profile 
Melbourne Storm profile
NRL profile

2000 births
Living people
Australia national rugby league team players
Australian people of Danish descent
Australian sportspeople of Samoan descent
Australian people of English descent
Australian rugby league players
Eastern Suburbs Tigers players
Gold Coast Titans players
Melbourne Storm players
Queensland Rugby League State of Origin players
Rugby league locks
Rugby league players from Orange, New South Wales
Rugby league second-rows
Samoa national rugby league team players
Sunshine Coast Falcons players